Geronima Parasole (1569–1622) was an Italian wood block cutter and print maker.  She was the sister of Isabella Parasole.

References

16th-century Italian artists
16th-century Italian painters
17th-century Italian painters
16th-century Italian women artists
17th-century Italian women artists
Italian engravers
Italian Baroque painters
Italian women painters